The Pakistan Orienteering Association is the national sports governing body to promote and develop sport of orienteering in Pakistan. The association is the provisional member of International Orienteering Federation.

References

Sports governing bodies in Pakistan
International Orienteering Federation members